The Type 004 aircraft carrier is a planned aircraft carrier of the People's Liberation Army Navy's aircraft carrier programme.  It is intended to be an iteration on the preceding Type 003 aircraft carrier, and like the Type 003, it will feature an integrated electric propulsion system that will allow the operation of electromagnetic launch catapults.  Unlike the conventionally-powered Type 003, the Type 004 will be larger and also the first Chinese carrier to feature nuclear marine propulsion, and could generate enough electricity to power laser weapons and railguns currently under development.  , China hoped to complete this carrier by the late 2020s, and indicated that up to four might be built.

Development

Research
In 2017, China's central government was reportedly ready to spend RMB 22 billion (US$3.3 billion) on the development of two prototype molten salt nuclear reactors to be built at Wuwei in Gansu province. The goal then was to have the reactors operational by 2020. The PLA Navy is interested in the technology to power its warships and aircraft carriers.

Construction
In late 2017, 1600-ton gantry cranes were installed in Jiangnan Shipyard, prompting speculation that the aircraft carrier would be built there. Later, in March 2018, a leak by shipbuilder China Shipbuilding Industry Corporation, the owner of Dalian Shipyard, suggested that the nuclear-powered Type 004 aircraft carrier would be part of its portfolio as well. In April 2018, news.com.au, an Australian tabloid claimed that metal cutting for the Type 004 began back in December 2017.

Aircraft complement 
The Type 004 would likely carry a complement of J-15 and J-31 fighters, Xian KJ-600 airborne early warning and control aircraft, anti-submarine warfare aircraft of the People's Liberation Army Naval Air Force, and stealth attack drones.

It was previously suggested that the aircraft carrier could carry J-20 aircraft. However, in a programme on China Central Television, PLA Navy Rear Admiral Zhang Zhaozhong dismissed the possibility that the aircraft would be used on aircraft carriers as the aircraft was not structurally designed to cope with carrier operations. In addition, it does not have folding wings for compact storage, and its stealth coating would be susceptible to degradation while at sea.

See also
 Chinese aircraft carrier programme

References 

Aircraft carriers of the People's Liberation Army Navy
Proposed ships